Lasius umbratus, colloquially known as the yellow shadow ant and yellow lawn ant, is a palearctic species of parasitic ant distributed across Eurasia and the Maghreb region of Africa. It was once thought that this species occurred in North America as well, but comparative genomic studies indicate the Afro-Eurasian and American populations are discrete and not closely related enough to represent a single species. The North American populations are now treated as a different species, Lasius aphidicola.

The queens of this species seek out a Lasius niger worker ant, to first kill in order to gain the worker ant's scent and then to discreetly sneak inside a Lasius niger nest. Once inside the Lasius umbratus queen finds the Lasius niger queen, and kills her. The worker ants will care for the new queen's larvae and slowly the colony will be made up of only Lasius umbratus individuals. Ant species like Lasius Fuliginosus Find Lasius Umbratus Colonies and found their own nest by killing the Lasius Umbratus Queen.

They are sometimes confused with Lasius flavus (yellow meadow ant) but unlike L. flavus they forage for food on the surface.

References

External links

umbratus
Slave-making ants
Insects described in 1846
Taxa named by William Nylander (botanist)